Renato Cappellini (born 9 October 1943) is a retired Italian professional footballer who played as a striker.

Honours
Internazionale
 Serie A champion: 1965–66.

Roma
 Anglo-Italian Cup winner: 1972.

External links

 

1943 births
Living people
Italian footballers
Italy international footballers
Serie A players
Inter Milan players
Genoa C.F.C. players
S.S.D. Varese Calcio players
A.S. Roma players
Como 1907 players
Italian expatriate footballers
Expatriate footballers in Switzerland
Italian expatriate sportspeople in Switzerland
FC Chiasso players
People_from_Soncino

Association football forwards
Sportspeople from the Province of Cremona
Footballers from Lombardy